Salsk is a town and the administrative center of Salsky District in Rostov Oblast, Russia, located on the Sredny Yegorlyk River (Don's basin),  southeast of Rostov-on-Don, the administrative center of the oblast. Population: 56,832 (2020),

History

It was established as a settlement serving Torgovaya railway station, which opened in 1899. It was granted town status and renamed Salsk in 1926. Salsk was occupied by Nazi Germany from July 31, 1942 as a part of the operation known as Case Blue.

Administrative and municipal status
Within the framework of administrative divisions, Salsk serves as the administrative center of Salsky District. As an administrative division, it is incorporated within Salsky District as Salskoye Urban Settlement. As a municipal division, this administrative unit also has urban settlement status and is a part of Salsky Municipal District.

References

Notes

Sources

Cities and towns in Rostov Oblast